Iorlando Pereira Marques Filho known as Marques (born January 14, 1985) is a Brazilian football striker.

Manager Carlos Brito brought Marques to Portuguese side Leixões in January 2008.

References

External links
Profile at Foradejogo.net

1985 births
Living people
Brazilian footballers
Brazilian expatriate footballers
Brazilian expatriate sportspeople in Portugal
Expatriate footballers in Portugal
Association football forwards
Avaí FC players
Vila Nova Futebol Clube players
Mirassol Futebol Clube players
Leixões S.C. players
F.C. Vizela players
Brasília Futebol Clube players
Grêmio Esportivo Brasil players
Esporte Clube Santo André players
América Futebol Clube (SP) players
Boa Esporte Clube players
Comercial Futebol Clube (Ribeirão Preto) players
Sociedade Esportiva Recreativa e Cultural Brasil players
Esporte Clube Pelotas players
Clube Atlético Linense players
União Recreativa dos Trabalhadores players
Sportspeople from Goiânia